Caenimonas koreensis  is a Gram-negative, strictly aerobic, rod-shaped and non-motile bacterium from the genus of Caenimonas which has been isolated from activated sludge in Pohang on Korea.

References

Comamonadaceae
Bacteria described in 2008